A cruising rod is a simple device used to quickly estimate the number of pieces of lumber yielded by a given piece of timber.  Similarly to a yardstick, it is a rod with markings. The estimation is carried out as follows. Standing at arm's length from the tree, estimate its average diameter by taking a note on the rod's markings. Walk away to see the whole tree; hold the rod upright at the distance from the eye at which the rod and the tree appear of the same diameter; the noted mark on the rod will show an approximate location of an   log cut along the tree height.

See also
Timber cruise
Biltmore stick

References

External links 

Dimensional instruments
Forest modelling
Forestry tools